N550 can refer to:
 Atom N550, a CPU model made by Intel
 London Buses route N550
 A quality of Carbon black